The colonial governors of Burma were the colonial administrators responsible for the territory of British Burma, an area equivalent to modern-day Myanmar.

As a result of the Second Anglo-Burmese War, Burma was initially setup as a province of British India. Later it was made a separate crown colony within the British Empire. Following invasion by the Empire of Japan during World War II, it was controlled by a Japanese military governor. After the Japanese were expelled, it was under a Allied military commander, then a civilian governor until independence.

List
(Dates in italics indicate de facto continuation of office)

See also

President of Myanmar
List of presidents of Myanmar
Vice-President of Myanmar
Prime Minister of Myanmar
List of premiers of British Burma
List of prime ministers of Myanmar
Deputy Prime Minister of Myanmar
State Counsellor of Myanmar
Chairman of the State Administration Council

References

External links
World Statesmen – Myanmar (Burma)

Administrators in British Burma
colonial governors
Colonial governors
Burma